Polymath Park is a  resort  southeast of Pittsburgh, Pennsylvania, United States, in the Laurel Highlands of Western Pennsylvania.

The site, near the village of Acme in Westmoreland County, is surrounded by private forest in the Allegheny Mountains and features four architectural landmarks: Frank Lloyd Wright's (1867–1959) Donald C. Duncan House and R. W. Lindholm Residence, and two others by Peter Berndtson (1909–1972), who was one of the original Wright apprentices. The park is near Wright's Fallingwater (23 miles) and Kentuck Knob (29 miles). Duncan House and Lindholm House are the only Wright houses in the area that accommodate overnight visitors.

Berndtson's 1962 master plan for Polymath Park allowed for 24 dwellings, each sited in a circular clearing in the forest. Only two houses, however, were actually built: the Balter House in 1964 and the 1965 Blum House. Duncan House was added to the park in June 2007. Built in 1957 in Lisle, Illinois, for Donald and Elizabeth Duncan, Wright's prefab Usonian was deconstructed in suburban Chicago in 2004 and reassembled in Pennsylvania. Lindholm House, named Mäntylä, was built in 1952 for R. W. Lindholm at Cloquet, Minnesota, and was dismantled in 2016 and rebuilt at Polymath Park in 2018.  It opened in April 2019.

Polymath Park is run by the nonprofit Usonian Preservation Corporation. Proceeds from rentals go toward maintenance of the houses and to architectural education programs.

References
 Barbara Ireland (2008). Overnight With Frank Lloyd Wright, The New York Times. Retrieved March 2, 2008.
 Patricia Lowry (2007). Frank Lloyd Wright's Duncan House ready for visitors, Pittsburgh Post-Gazette. Retrieved June 13, 2007.

 Mary Pickels (2019). Polymath Park opens second Frank Lloyd Wright home in Mt. Pleasant Township, Pittsburgh Tribune-Review. Retrieved April 29, 2019.

External links
Official Polymath Park website

Parks in Westmoreland County, Pennsylvania
Parks in the Pittsburgh metropolitan area
Frank Lloyd Wright buildings
Houses in Westmoreland County, Pennsylvania
Laurel Highlands
Relocated buildings and structures in Pennsylvania